A list of ministers of climate change or officials in charge of cabinet positions with portfolios dealing primarily with climate change and issues related to mitigation of global warming.

A

Australia

Austria

B

Belgium

C

Canada

D

Denmark

E

European Union

F

Finland

France

G

Germany

Greece

I

Ireland

India

Italy

L

Luxembourg

M

Malaysia

Malta

N

Netherlands

New Zealand

Niue

Norway

P

Pakistan

Portugal

R

Romania

S

Scotland

Spain

Sweden

U

United Kingdom

See also

 List of environmental ministries
 List of ministers of the environment

References

External links

Climate change

Ministers of climate change